Nemophas cyanescens is a species of beetle in the family Cerambycidae. It was described by Karl Jordan in 1898. It is known from Moluccas.

References

cyanescens
Beetles described in 1898